Spur 482, known better as Storey Lane, is a short connector route located in the Dallas area. The route originates at the site of the former Texas Stadium and ends northwest of Love Field.

Route description
Spur 482 begins at State Highway 183 (SH 183) near the site of the former Texas Stadium and almost immediately has an interchange with SH 114. Crossing the Trinity River, the highway drops its freeway status and becomes a surface street. The highway crosses under Interstate 35E (I-35E) without any direct access and ends at a complex interchange with Loop 12/Harry Hines Boulevard.

History
Spur 482 was designated on January 7, 1971, replacing a section of Loop 12.

Future
The western terminus of Spur 482 is part of the Irving Diamond Interchange project. The project, also known as the Ultimate Diamond Interchange, is designed to relieve traffic on Loop 12 in the area and redo the interchanges with SH 183 and SH 114.

Major intersections

See also

References

Spur 482
Transportation in Dallas County, Texas